Shine On is the first solo album by Kee Marcello, the former guitarist in the Swedish hard rock band Europe.

Track listing
All songs written by Kee Marcello, except where noted.
 "When the Rain Comes Falling" – 4:01
 "Shine On" – 4:00
 "Sweet Little Sister" – 4:32 (Kee Marcello, Fredrik von Gerber, Nestor Geli)
 "Rough Ride to Paradise" – 4:16
 "La Liaison" – 4:35
 "Tonight Belongs to Us" – 4:26
 "Credo (I Believe)" – 5:33 (Kee Marcello, Nestor Geli)
 "The Wind Cries Your Name" – 4:48
 "The River of Karma" – 4:33 (Kee Marcello, Nestor Geli)
 "Fine Line" – 5:00 (Kee Marcello, Nestor Geli)
 "Together Alone" – 8:16 (Kee Marcello, Nestor Geli)

Personnel
Kee Marcello – Lead vocals, guitars
Johan Lyndström – Guitars
Svante Henryson – Bass
Mats Asplén – Keyboards
Magnus Persson – Drums

Album credits 
Magnus Persson - Producer
Kee Marcello - Producer

References 
https://web.archive.org/web/20080509053257/http://glory.metalkings.ru/bands/m/kee-marcello.htm

Kee Marcello albums
1995 debut albums
Country rock albums by Swedish artists